Arevshat is a village in the Artik Municipality of the Shirak Province of Armenia. The Statistical Committee of Armenia reported its population was 2,082 in 2010, up from 1,785 at the 2001 census.

Demographics

References 

Communities in Shirak Province
Populated places in Shirak Province